Saint-Nicolas-de-la-Grave (Languedocien: Sent Micolau de la Grava) is a commune in the Tarn-et-Garonne department in the Occitanie region in southern France. Antoine Laumet de La Mothe, sieur de Cadillac, the founder of the American city of Detroit was born here in 1658.

See also
 Communes of the Tarn-et-Garonne department
 André Abbal

References

Communes of Tarn-et-Garonne